Steam 125 was a series of events held in 1998 to mark the 125th anniversary of the Isle of Man Railway opening its first route from Douglas to Peel (the line was closed in 1968 but the line to Port Erin opened the following year remains in operation) the railway ran a large number of special events. Most notable was the return to service of the original steam locomotive No. 1 "Sutherland" which hauled special services all year, including excursions on the Manx Electric Railway; other highlights included night trains, arranged photography sessions, slide and film shows, unusual tram trips, and visiting locomotives on the Groudle Glen Railway and many more. This was the last of the "big" railway events on the island, which had begun with the "Year of Railways" in 1993 to mark the centenary of the Manx Electric Railway. Although there are still annual events periods on the island these are now a very half-hearted affair and do not bring the enthusiasts as they once did.

Events
Following the successful pattern established with 1993's Year Of Railways the biggest draw of the events periods centered on the return to service of the railway's first locomotive dating from 1873 and this was commemorated by a public re-commissioning followed by a special train to Port Erin. Included in the array of varied events elsewhere on the island's railway network were:-

 Use of a low loader to transfer No. 1 "Sutherland" to Laxey where it ran a service on the Manx Electric Railway between Laxey and Fairy Cottage
 Illuminated tram redecorated to proclaim "Steam 125"; it ran shuttles to Groudle where the Groudle Glen Railway put on evening services
 Photo trams and trains ran which would stop at preselected scenic locations so that the passengers could alight, photograph and proceed to the next location
 Visiting locomotive "Jack" on the Groudle Glen Railway as well as additional evening and weekend services on that line in events periods
 Chasing buses that shadowed special services to viewpoints and chased ahead to await the arrival of trains/trams, sometimes utilising vintage buses
 Special tram services were featured that included running commentaries about the views and attractions along the length of the routes with stopping places
 Parallel-running of a variety of electric tramcars which this usually took place prior to daily services to facilitate use of both running lines
 Floodlit evening photography and barbecues were held with staff creating shunting movements for the benefit of spectators, often with little-used rolling stock
 Guided tours around sheds and depots which would normally be closed to members of the public, both in the day and in conjunction with evening sessions
Guided walks of the closed railway lines to Peel, Ramsey and Foxdale with connecting vintage buses and coaches between venues, and refreshments
Slide and film shows with a "bring your own along" policy ensuring a varied mix of entertainments, also including raffles and other attractions
The return of steam to Peel in the form of No. 1 "Sutherland" running on a small section of track in what had previously been Peel Station
Cavalcade line-ups of the horse tram fleet outside the workshops at Derby Castle, including some rarely used tramcars in service along the promenade

This series of special events on the island's railways proved to be the last significant period of events held, with the galas gradually becoming less significant and held over a shorter period of time, as management policies changed into the new millennium.

See also
 Isle of Man Railway
 Manx Electric Railway
 Snaefell Mountain Railway
 Douglas Horse Tram
 Groudle Glen Railway
 Great Laxey Mine Railway

Isle of Man Railway